Church Road was a 4,500-capacity football stadium Hayes, England – the home-ground of Hayes F.C., and latterly Hayes & Yeading United F.C. following the two clubs' merger in 2007.

History
After initially playing at Botwell Common, Hayes F.C. (then known as Botwell Mission) moved to the ground in Church Road. The site was originally named Cox's Meadow and later Townfield. It officially opened with a Whites vs Stripes trial match on 26 August 1920. During World War II the clubhouse was hit by a bomb dropped by the Luftwaffe. The record attendance at the ground was 15,370 for an FA Amateur Cup match against Bromley in 1951.

Hayes & Yeading F.C. left the ground reluctantly at the end of the 2010–11 season, moving to a purportedly temporary groundshare at Woking's Kingfield Stadium, with the intention of relocating to Yeading's Warren ground in Beaconsfield Road.

The Church Road stadium was demolished in 2011, making way for a swiftly built Barratt Homes housing development.

For some twenty years before its demolition, the spacious car-park at the front of the former stadium was the site of a popular local community market on Wednesdays and Fridays each week.

References

Defunct football venues in England
Football venues in London
Hayes & Yeading United F.C.
Hayes F.C.
Sports venues completed in 1920
Sports venues demolished in 2011
Demolished sports venues in the United Kingdom
Former buildings and structures in the London Borough of Hillingdon
1920 establishments in England
2011 disestablishments in England